John Hamilton Reynolds (April 3, 1923 – November 4, 2000) was an American physicist and a specialist in mass spectrometry.

Life
John H. Reynolds was born  in Cambridge, Massachusetts, United States.  He studied first at Harvard University and, after serving in the Navy during World War II, at the University of Chicago.  There, he was influenced by his Ph.D. thesis advisor Mark Inghram and by two other famous physicists, Harold Urey and Enrico Fermi. He specialized in mass spectrometry and utilized this method to determine isotope ratios needed for the radiometric dating of geologically and cosmologically relevant samples. In 1950 he was appointed as professor to the University of California, Berkeley where he continued his research on isotope ratios in meteorites, leading to the discovery in 1960 that the Richardton meteorite and other meteorites had an excess of xenon-129, thought to be a result of the beta decay of iodine-129 in the early Solar System.  His improvement of potassium-argon dating was adopted by several institutions.

Reynolds was elected to the National Academy of Sciences in 1968.  He died of pneumonia on November 4, 2000 in Berkeley, California, United States.

References

1923 births
2000 deaths
University of Chicago alumni
Harvard University alumni
20th-century American physicists
Members of the United States National Academy of Sciences
Fellows of the American Physical Society
United States Navy personnel of World War II